Harrisia is the name of two genera of life forms:

Harrisia (plant): a genus of cacti
Harrisia (fly): a genus of fly